Carl Frode Tiller (born 4 January 1970 in Namsos) is a Norwegian author, historian and musician. His works are in Nynorsk (lit. "New Norwegian"), one of the two official Norwegian standard languages. 

Tiller made his literary debut in 2001 with the novel Skråninga (The Slope), which was recognized as the best Norwegian literary debut of the year with the Tarjei Vesaas' debutantpris and nominated for the Brage Prize. In November 2007 Tiller was awarded the Brage Prize for his novel :no:Innsirkling (Encirclement). In the fall of 2007 :no:Innsirkling received the Norwegian Critics Prize for Literature and was nominated for the premiere Scandinavian literature prize, the Nordic Council's Literature Prize. It also won him the European Union Literary Award in 2009. 

Tiller is also a musician in the band Kong Ler.

His daughter is a member of UHSN. Her name is Oline.

Bibliography 
2001: Skråninga (The Slope) – novel
2003: Bipersonar (Minor Characters) – novel
2007: :no:Innsirkling (Encirclement) – novel
2007: Folkehelsa (Public Health) – play (2007) 
2010: Innsikling II (Encirclement II) – novel

Awards 
Tarjei Vesaas' debutantpris 2001, for Skråninga
Aschehoug's Debutant Endowment 2001, for Skråninga
NRK P2 Listener's Prize 2001, for Skråninga
Sunnmøre Prize 2001, for Skråninga
:no:Bjørnsonstipendet 2004, for Bipersonar
Brage Prize 2007, for Innsirkling
Mads Wiel Nygaards Endowment 2007
Norwegian Critics Prize for Literature 2007, for Innsirkling
Sultprisen 2008

References

External links
 Carl Frode Tiller at Aschehoug Agency
 Norwegian language pages Official homepage
 Norwegian language pages Carl Frode Tiller in NRK Forfatter
 Norwegian language pages Carl Frode Tiller in the Dagbladet newspaper
 Norwegian language pages Carl Frode Tiller in the newspaper Aftenposten
 Norwegian language pages Authors at the Aschehougs publishers website

1970 births
Living people
21st-century Norwegian novelists
Norwegian Critics Prize for Literature winners
21st-century Norwegian historians
Norwegian musicians
Nynorsk-language writers
People from Namsos